The Piano Quartet No. 2 in A major, Op. 26, by Johannes Brahms is scored for piano, violin, viola and cello. It was completed in 1861 and received its premiere in November 1862 by the Hellmesberger Quartet with the composer playing the piano part. It has been especially noted for drawing influence from composer Franz Schubert. Lasting approximately 50 minutes, this quartet is the longest of Brahms's chamber works to perform. He also made an arrangement of this quartet for two pianos.

Structure
The quartet is in four movements:

Analysis

First movement 
The first movement is in sonata form.

Second movement 
The second movement is in rondo form.

Third movement 
The third movement is a scherzo and trio in compound ternary form, where both the scherzo and the trio are in sonata form.

Fourth movement 
The fourth movement is in sonata-rondo form.

References

External links

Chamber music by Johannes Brahms
Brahms 3
1875 compositions
Compositions in A major